Marvil (also Romanized as Marvīl) is a village in Muzaran Rural District, in the Central District of Malayer County, Hamadan Province, Iran. At the 2006 census, its population was 392, in 101 families.

References 

Populated places in Malayer County